Tiffany Adams Coyne (born May 6, 1982) is an American model and dancer best known for her role of model and hostess on the CBS game show Let's Make a Deal.

Early life and career
Tiffany Lynn Adams was born in Layton, Utah on May 6, 1982. She began dancing at age three, focusing on jazz, hip hop, and ballet. As a youth, her family moved a lot because her mother "liked to build houses".  The family lived near Hill Air Force Base, and Adams attended middle school and one year of high school in West Haven, Utah. She completed her high school education at Northridge High School in Layton after the family moved back to the town. She was on the dance squad at nearby Fremont High School. After graduating in 2000, Coyne spent the next two years with the America First Jazz Dancers for the Utah Jazz. During that time, she also taught dance classes locally. After a stint performing on a cruise ship, Coyne relocated to Las Vegas, Nevada and performed in Jubilee!, Fashionistas, and Sirens of TI. 

When CBS relaunched the game show Let's Make a Deal in 2009, Coyne was hired as the show's floor model following multiple auditions. She taped two episodes daily and then continued performing in Sirens of TI at night. Deal moved to Los Angeles during the first season, resulting in Coyne commuting back and forth between California and Nevada five days a week until she relocated to Los Angeles for the second season. She then took classes in order to improve her improvisation skills while working with Wayne Brady and Jonathan Mangum.

In addition to Let's Make a Deal, Coyne appeared as herself in The Bold and the Beautiful, was a stand-in on The Price Is Right, and did modeling work for United Airlines and Chase Bank.

Personal life
Coyne's father is of German descent and her mother of Hungarian descent, and she has two sisters, five stepsisters and two stepbrothers. She and her husband, singer Chris Coyne, currently live in Los Angeles. Their first child, Scarlett Rose, was born on August 1, 2013. Their son, Carter Liam, was born on February 24, 2018.

References

External links
 
 
 
 Tiffany Coyne — CBS.com

Coyne, Tiffany
Coyne, Tiffany
Coyne, Tiffany
Coyne, Tiffany
Coyne, Tiffany
Coyne, Tiffany
Coyne, Tiffany
Coyne, Tiffany
Coyne, Tiffany
Coyne, Tiffany